Philip Thomas (birth unknown – death unknown) was a Welsh rugby union and professional rugby league footballer who played in the 1900s and 1910s.

Playing career

International honours
Phil Thomas won caps for Wales (RL) while at Leeds, and Hull Kingston Rovers 4-caps 1908…1911, and won a cap for Great Britain (RL) while at Leeds in 1908 against New Zealand.

County honours
Phil Thomas won cap(s) for Yorkshire while at Leeds, including against New Zealand at Belle Vue, Wakefield on Wednesday 18 December 1907.

County Cup Final appearances
Phil Thomas played right-, i.e. number 3, in Hull Kingston Rovers' 10-22 defeat by Huddersfield in the 1911–12 Yorkshire County Cup Final during the 1911–12 season at Belle Vue, Wakefield on Saturday 25 November 1911, in front of a crowd of 20,000.

County Cup Final appearances
Phil Thomas changed rugby football codes from rugby union to rugby league when he transferred from Tredegar RFC to Oldham, he made his début for Oldham playing left-, i.e. number 4, in the 26–0 victory over Hunslet F.C. at Watersheddings, Oldham on Saturday 4 October 1902, and he played his last match for Oldham playing left-, i.e. number 4, in the 2–5 defeat by Bradford F.C. at Watersheddings, Oldham on Saturday 23 January 1904, he transferred from Oldham to Leeds, he transferred from Leeds to Hull Kingston Rovers, he transferred from Hull Kingston Rovers to Harrogate ARLFC.

References

External links
!Great Britain Statistics at englandrl.co.uk (statistics currently missing due to not having appeared for both Great Britain, and England)

Footballers who switched code
Great Britain national rugby league team players
Hull Kingston Rovers players
Leeds Rhinos players
Oldham R.L.F.C. players
Place of birth missing
Place of death missing
Rugby league centres
Tredegar RFC players
Wales national rugby league team players
Welsh rugby league players
Welsh rugby union players
Year of birth missing
Year of death missing
Yorkshire rugby league team players